The men's 10,000 metres walk event at the 1951 Pan American Games was held at the Estadio Monumental in Buenos Aires on 6 March. Race walking would not be contested again at the Games until 1963.

Results

References

Athletics at the 1951 Pan American Games
1951